"Liar (It Takes One to Know One)" is a song by American rock band Taking Back Sunday. The song was released as the third single from the band's third studio album Louder Now.

Release
"Liar (It Takes One to Know One)" was released to radio on September 19, 2006. The song was released as a single almost two months later on November 6.

Reception
AllMusic reviewer Corey Apar praised the wordplay between Adam Lazzara and Fred Mascherino, selecting the song as an AllMusic reviewer's pick. Alternative Press reviewer Scott Heisel said that "Liar (It Takes One to Know One)" is "hands down, the best song on Louder Now." Gigwise was more negative, saying the song "sounds like a Hot Hot Heat b-side, and nothing like the Taking Back Sunday we have come to know and love."

Music video
The song's music video was directed by Tony Petrossian. The music video was released on September 29, 2006.

Track listing

Charts

References

2006 songs
2006 singles
Taking Back Sunday songs
Warner Records singles
Song recordings produced by Eric Valentine
Music videos directed by Tony Petrossian